Tangail District is quite famous for its zamindari rule with three of the largest zamindars in the region believed to have been established during the Mughal period. In addition, several small zamindar classes developed in this area, whose reputation is still evident. One of such zamindar is Mohera Zamindar Bari.  Mohera Zamindar Bari is a 19th-century Zamidari residence in Mirzapur, Tangail District, Bangladesh. It is used as a police training school. The zamindar house was established in the mirzapur  before the 1890s. Mohera zamindar Bari is the most preserved and maintained zamindari Bari of Bangladesh locally. There is no such zamindari Bari as preserved and maintained as it is in the country. The zamindari Bari represents our culture, lifestyle, and history during British time.

Mohera Zamindar Bari is spread over an area of about eight (8) acres, about 18 km away from Tangail Sadar in the Dhaka Division of Bangladesh. Mohera Zamindar Bari is located on the Dhaka-Tangail Highway, about 4 km east of Natiapara Bazar. In front of the entrance of this zamindar's house, there is a huge lake called ' Bishakha Sagar' and there are two beautiful gates to enter the house. There are also two more ponds at the back of the main building called Pasra Pond and Rani Pond and there is a beautiful flower garden in the decoration. Adjacent to the Vishakha Sagar, on the south side, there is a huge Amr Kanan and three huge main buildings with Naib Saheb's house, Kachari's house, Gomstad's house, Dighi, and three more lodges.

History 
The zamindar house was established in Mirzapur, Tangail, in 1890 by Kali Charan Saha. Kali Charan Saha and Anand Saha, two brothers came to Mohera village from Calcutta. Besides their land lordship, they have conducted trading related to Jute and Salt. They were the owner of huge land properties from different parts of Bangladesh. During country division and war, most of them moved into India. Only very few are living at Tangail.  Since they were rich, people say they have built those buildings before establishing their Zamindari. In this locality, along with many schools, roads, water supply, they performed many activities for public welfare. then gradually began making those gigantic buildings. During the Bangladesh Liberation war, the Pakistan Army attacked the Mohera zamindar's house and killed five villagers, including the wife of the zamindar house (1971). Later the zamindar family left the country by boat on the river Lohajang. It was here that the Mukti Bahini camp was set up. An initiative was taken to establish this zamindar house as a police training school in 1982. The Police Training School was upgraded to a Police Training Center 1990.

Other installations 
Chowdhury Lodge: The pillars of this pink building are built in the style of Roman architecture. Inside the beautifully designed building is a corrugated roof. In front of this two-story building there is a beautiful garden and green field.

Maharaj Lodge: There are six (6) columns in front of the Maharaj Lodge building built in the Byzantine style of architecture. There is a curved railing in front of the pink Maharaja Lodge and a hanging verandah which adds to the beauty of the building. The building has a total of twelve (12) rooms, with a garden in the front and a tennis court in the back. This building is currently used as a shooting spot.

Ananda Lodge: Ananda Lodge is the most attractive building of Mohera Zamindar's house. Beside it is the most stylish and ostentatious lodge within the zamindari Bari. The columns has a touch of blue and white. In front of Ananda Lodge there is a garden with sculptures of deer, tiger and animals which represents the architecture of British period.

Kalicharan Lodge: Built towards the end of zamindari system, this Kalicharan Lodge is very different from other buildings. The building is built in the English architectural style, in line with the English ‘U’ letter. For different architectural styles, beautiful light flashes can be seen from the building in the afternoon.

How to go to Mohera Jamindari Bari 
Many buses from Moakhali Bus Terminal in Dhaka can quickly take the tourists to the Mohera Zamindar Bari. For example, Dhaleswari Service, Jhotika Service, AC BRTC which tourists can avail not at Moakhali Bus Stand but Kollanpur Bus Stand, etc. These buses will take tourists to Natia Para at Pakulla. From Natia Para bazaar tourists will be able to find auto rickshaw locally known as CNG, Tempo, and Rickshaw which will easily take tourists to Mohera Zamindar Bari.  The overall journey will not take more than three and a half hours, five-hour maximum if traffic remains on the road to a large extent.

References 

http://offroadbangladesh.com/places/mohera-zamindar-bari/

https://bangladeshpost.net/posts/craftsmanship-of-mohera-zamindar-bari-captures-minds-of-visitors-26239

https://www.obhijaan.com/mohera-jomidar-bari/

Buildings and structures in Dhaka Division
Bangladesh Police